Carmen Valero Omedes (born October 4, 1955, in Castelserás, Teruel) is a former middle-distance runner from Spain, who represented her native country at the 1976 Summer Olympics in Montreal, Quebec, Canada. There she was eliminated in the heats of the 800 and the 1500 metres. Valero was the only woman in the Spanish track and field squad for the Montreal Games.

Valero won the IAAF World Cross Country Championships of 1976 and 1977, and finished third in the World Cross Country Championships of 1975.

References

External links
 Spanish Olympic Committee

1955 births
Living people
Spanish female middle-distance runners
Olympic athletes of Spain
Athletes (track and field) at the 1976 Summer Olympics
Spanish female long-distance runners
World Athletics Cross Country Championships winners
Mediterranean Games bronze medalists for Spain
Mediterranean Games medalists in athletics
Athletes (track and field) at the 1975 Mediterranean Games
Spanish female cross country runners